The 1812 United States presidential election in Pennsylvania took place as part of the 1812 United States presidential election. Voters chose 25 representatives, or electors to the Electoral College, who voted for President and Vice President.

Pennsylvania voted for the Democratic-Republican candidate, James Madison, over the Federalist candidate, DeWitt Clinton. Madison won Pennsylvania by a margin of 25.2%.

Results

Note: Election results totals only include known numbers, as verified by the source. Vote totals from several counties are missing/unknown.

County results

See also
 List of United States presidential elections in Pennsylvania

Notes

References 

Pennsylvania
1812
1812 Pennsylvania elections